Samuel Medley (1769–1857) was an English painter, known also as one of the founders of University College, London.

Life
Born on 22 March 1769, he was son of Samuel Medley, the Baptist minister. Taking up painting as his profession, he exhibited for the first time at the Royal Academy, in 1792 sending The Last Supper. In 1805, however, he went on the Stock Exchange, for health reasons, where he made a comfortable income, continuing to paint in his leisure hours.

Medley was a member of a large Baptist community in London, under Francis Augustus Cox. With Cox, Henry Brougham, and some leading Dissenters, he was associated in founding University College, London, in 1826.

Medley lived in later life at Chatham, where he died on 10 August 1857, and was buried.

Works
Medley painted religious and historical subjects, but turned mainly to portraits. A large group of his represents the Medical Society of London; it was engraved by Cooper Branwhite.

Family
Medley married, first, in 1792 Susannah, daughter of George Bowley of Bishopsgate Street, London; second, in 1818, Elizabeth, daughter of John Smallshaw of Liverpool. By his first wife he had three sons, William, Guy, and George, and three daughters, of whom the eldest, Susannah, married Henry Thompson, and was mother of Sir Henry Thompson the surgeon.

References

Attribution

1769 births
1857 deaths
18th-century English painters
English male painters
English Baptists
19th-century English painters
19th-century English male artists
18th-century English male artists